Jewel Bey (born 16 April 1969) is a former Indian footballer from Assam. Bey played as a midfielder.

Playing career

Early career
Bey was born in Karbi Anglong district of Assam. In 1989, he has represented the Assam state team for the Santosh Trophy which was held in Guwahati. In 1992, he also played for the Delhi U-23 State team and Maharashtra state team in 1994.

Club career
He has played for quite a few numbers of local clubs of Assam including Maharana Athletic Club, Gauhati Town Club, ASEB SC, SAI Guwahati and Assam Police Blues.

Bey was signed by eminent clubs Dempo SC and Mahindra & Mahindra for their seasons.

International career
In 1989, he made his senior International debut for India national football team in South Asian Games. After that he represented the senior India side many occasions including 1991 Pre Olympic, 1993 Nehru Gold Cup and Pre-Olympic in 1993.

Coaching
After retiring from the game, Bey is involved in coaching. In 2001, this former International midfielder joined as assistant coach of Assam Police Blues. Later, the head coach P.X. Kanan was replaced with Bey and he became the head coach cum manager of the Blues.

Personal life
Bey joined Assam Police in 2001, and now serving as an Assistant Commandant in Assam Police Battalion.

Honours

India
SAFF Championship: 1993

References

Indian footballers
1969 births
Footballers from Assam
Association football midfielders
India international footballers
Dempo SC players
Mahindra United FC players
Gauhati Town Club players
Assam State Electricity Board SC players
People from Karbi Anglong district
Living people